Crazy Sexy Cancer is a documentary film created by actress/photographer Kris Carr. The film premiered on March 11, 2007, at the South by Southwest (SXSW) Film Festival, and had its US television premiere on August 29, 2007, on TLC. The film was edited by Pagan Harleman and Brian Fassett.  The music was composed by Matthew Puckett.

The film tells the story of Carr's battle with epithelioid hemangioendothelioma (EHE), a vascular cancer in the lining of the blood vessels in her liver and lungs so rare that only 0.01 percent of the cancer population has it. Around 200 to 300 cases are diagnosed in America every year - the cause is unknown.

Kris Carr has also written two books, Crazy Sexy Cancer Tips, based upon the film, and Crazy Sexy Cancer Survivor.

Plot summary
Crazy Sexy Cancer is the personal video diary of Kris Carr, a young actress, photographer, and filmmaker. Carr's struggle with cancer begins after a visit to the doctor, following a particularly difficult yoga class. Initially thinking it was a yoga-related injury, Carr is devastated to learn she has a rare form of cancer, epithelioid hemangioendothelioma (EHE). Despite its rarity, Carr is told that her tumors are not behaving aggressively, and so her doctor advises that she "watch and wait" for two months before having more tests to determine whether the tumors change, grow, or remain the same. Despite the grim prognosis, Carr refuses to accept her sickness as an end to her life, and sets out to explore alternative methods with which to fight her cancer.  After her doctor recommends she start taking care of her body with diet and exercise, Carr is determined to "take that crumb and turn it into a cake."  Her first stop out of the doctor's office is a shopping trip to the organic grocer Whole Foods.  Her careful and precise monitoring of her food intake allows her a sense of control which she finds comforting.

Epithelioid Hemangioendothelioma
As Carr discovers at the beginning of the film, she has a rare form of cancer called epithelioid hemangioendothelioma (EHE). In Kris Carr's case, she has tumors affecting the blood vessels in her liver and lungs. From the doctor's explanation, her liver has so many tumors it looks like Swiss cheese. EHE is so rare, it is only diagnosed 200 to 300 times a year, or to about .1 percent of the population. Characteristics of the cancer include a tumor that rarely metastasizes and is very difficult to diagnose. As is the case with Kris Carr, it is "most often an incidental finding in young asymptomatic women."

Finding a doctor
Kris Carr conducts her search for an oncologist almost as if she were conducting a job interview. She makes it clear that what she does not want is a doctor that will focus on the negative aspect of her illness, and instead searches for a doctor that will support her in her plan to live her life to the fullest. One doctor suggests she undergo a triple organ transplant (both her lungs and her liver), an idea that Carr does not take a liking to, particularly because it is so invasive and not necessary. She eventually finds Dr. George Demetri, director of the Center for Sarcoma and Bone Oncology at the Dana–Farber Cancer Institute in Boston, and his optimism about Carr's situation allows for a great relationship between doctor and patient.

"Healing Junkie"
Carr refuses to sit back and wait for her body to be ravaged by her cancer. When her doctor tells her to try to boost her immune system by changing her diet and lifestyle, Carr clings to this hope with as much fervor as possible. She starts by ditching her old habits of turning to convenient "low-fat" diet foods and trades it in for a new vegan diet. She enrolls in a healing program by Hippocrates Health Institute in West Palm Beach, Florida and immediately her refrigerator is filled with such foods as "leafy greens, vegetables, sprouted grains, nuts, seeds, and every kind of juice possible, including tons of wheatgrass."

Alternative medicine
In addition to her new diet, Carr also adopts a new, healthier way of life that includes detoxing her body through exercise and alternative medicine. She subjects herself to enemas as well as treats herself to massages and new-wave therapies such as infrared saunas. She sees a chiropractor and an acupuncturist, all in pursuit of finding an alternative way to battle her illness. While it is yoga that initially brings Carr to her diagnosis, it also helps Carr in her healing process. Yoga becomes a part of her daily activities. In addition to improving her physical well-being, Carr approaches her cancer with a certain amount of spirituality. She visits a Zen Monastery, and even develops her own "special space" where she spends at least 10 minutes every day praying, meditating, and giving thanks for her family, friends, and the life she lives. As she describes in both her film and her books, Cancer is her guru. As Carr describes it, "Cancer creates pandemonium." Instead of succumbing to the cancer, Carr says, you should use it for your spiritual growth, an idea that Carr adopted well in her healing journey.

Crazy sexy life
In the movie, Carr emphasizes the importance of having a "cancer posse." In addition to documenting her own personal illness narrative, Carr also interviews other young women who suffer from cancer, and how they have chosen to live with it as though it were a blessing rather than a curse. Crazy Sexy Cancer is Carr's first piece of work. Her other publications include two books titled, Crazy Sexy Cancer Tips and Crazy Sexy Cancer Survivor: More Rebellion and Fire for Your Healing Journey. These books include articles and introductions by other famous female cancer survivors, including Sheryl Crow, Marisa Acocella Marchetto, Diem Brown, Jackie Farry, and many more. In addition to the film and books, Carr has essentially pioneered an entire online community intended to support other strong-willed women in their fight against cancer. When Carr was originally diagnosed, she felt alone and confused in her struggle.

Healing narrative
Crazy Sexy Cancer is a film that focuses on "healing" (in a spiritual sense of the word) rather than the illness itself. This film is more than a story of a woman with cancer. As the film progresses, so does Carr herself, and we see how in the end it is the cancer that heals Carr. Some ideas and themes that are seen throughout Crazy Sexy Cancer include:

Optimism – The tone of the entire film is upbeat. Carr chooses to approach her illness with optimism almost immediately. Despite her fear surrounding her initial diagnosis, her first step toward healing is finding a doctor that does not resort to negative thoughts. This theme of optimism surrounds Carr for the majority of the film. In one scene, Carr looks directly at the camera and proclaims “I am NOT sick!” over and over again. She describes one doctor's diagnosis of a 100% fatality rate as “nonsense”, and she jokes with the cameramen as she proclaims that her personal “pharmacy” is Whole Foods. There are moments of vulnerability for Carr just as there are ups and downs for anyone dealing with an illness, but for the most part these moments are forgotten when compared to her moments of empowerment and strength. At one point in the movie, Carr discusses with her oncologist the topic of spontaneous remission, the idea that cancer can basically improve or disappear on its own, despite what the diagnosis might be. Dr. Demetri tells her that sometimes doctors tend to search for the negative. Carr and her doctor work together to focus on how Carr can live her life to its fullest.

Control- The idea of empowerment over illness is a theme that radiates throughout the film.  As soon as her doctor tells her that one part of her body she can control is what she eats and how she lives her life, Carr immediately transforms her diet and lifestyle. While she cannot control the tumors themselves, she can control the body that harbors these tumors.

New Self- On the outside, there is no difference between Kris Carr's pre-diagnosis body and post-diagnosis body. She was diagnosed at the age of 31. Not only this, but Carr made a living off of her looks. She was a model and actress and had recently been shown a glimmer of fame when she appeared in two Budweiser commercials that aired during the Super Bowl. Now, she faces cancer and all the questions that inevitably accompany such a disease. Throughout the film, we see a transformation in Carr. Saying goodbye to her old life of partying and unhealthy lifestyle choices, Carr embraces her new self as a “health junkie.” As Kris describes in an article, “Even though I have cancer, I have never felt healthier.” Kris also must adjust her life to the idea that she is living with cancer. Carr's case is not like a normal cancer case. She was not given a certain number of months to live, and all she can do about her cancer is wait and see what happens. Her doctor tells her she could live her entire life with cancer. As Carr films her experience, she has a creative outlet with which she can make sense of it. This documentary is a form of therapy for Carr, and therefore is a healing narrative in itself. As Rita Charon states in her book, Narrative Medicine, "as it takes away, illness also gives searing clarity about the life being lived around it." When Carr calls cancer her "guru", she means that while her cancer makes her physically ill, it is through this illness that she becomes spiritually and mentally strong.

References

External links
 Official site
 TLC's Website
 Kris Carr's Crazy Sexy Infrared Saunas
 Crazy Sexy Cancer Tips - The Book
 Crazy Sexy Cancer Tips Tour
 Kris Carr's Crazy Sexy Cancer blog
 
 

2007 films
American documentary films
Documentary films about cancer
2007 documentary films
2000s English-language films
2000s American films